Lorenzo Insigne  (born 4 June 1991) is an Italian professional footballer who plays as a winger for Major League Soccer club Toronto FC and the Italy national team.

Insigne began his professional career with Napoli in 2009, making his Serie A debut in 2010, but was later sent on consecutive season loan spells to Cavese, Foggia and Pescara, before returning to Napoli in 2012. Insigne is capable of playing on either flank, or through the centre, but is usually deployed as left winger. He is known in particular for his creativity, short height, speed and technical ability, as well as his accuracy from free-kicks.

Insigne has represented the Italy national under-21 team, with which he won a runner-up medal at the 2013 UEFA European Under-21 Championship. He made his debut for the senior team in September 2012, and has represented Italy at the 2014 FIFA World Cup, UEFA Euro 2016, and UEFA Euro 2020, winning the latter tournament.

Club career

Early career
In 2006, at age 15, Insigne was signed by Napoli from Olimpia Sant'Arpino for €1,500. In 2008, he made his debut for the Primavera team, with whom he scored 15 goals in the 2009–10 season. He was first called-up to the first team under Roberto Donadoni, playing some friendlies in the summer of 2009, before making his Serie A debut under Walter Mazzarri, on 24 January 2010, in a 2–0 win away to Livorno. He played the remainder of the season on loan at Cavese in Lega Pro Prima Divisione, where he made 10 appearances.

Loans to Foggia and Pescara

The following season, Insigne was loaned to Foggia in Lega Pro Prima Divisione. He scored his first professional goal on 14 August, in the Coppa Italia Lega Pro match against L'Aquila, while on 29 August, he scored his first league goal in a 2–3 home defeat to Lucchese. Under the manager Zdeněk Zeman, he totalled 19 goals in the league, in addition to seven goals scored in Coppa Italia Lega Pro.

On 8 July 2011, he was loaned to Pescara in Serie B, now managed by Zeman. He made his debut in the Italian second division on 26 August 2011 in the opening round against Hellas Verona, and on 4 September scored his first goal for Pescara away against Modena. Insigne finished the season with 18 goals, making him the second top-scorer of the season behind teammate Ciro Immobile, and 14 assists. Among the key players of Pescara's title-winning season and promotion to Serie A, Insigne was subsequently awarded the "Best Player" of the Serie B season, along with teammates Immobile and Marco Verratti.

Napoli

At the end of the season, Insigne returned to Napoli, choosing the number 24 jersey. On 16 September 2012, he scored his first goal in Serie A, after entering as a substitute for Edinson Cavani in a 3–1 home win over Parma. Four days later, he made his debut in UEFA club competitions, starting in a 4–0 win against Swedish side AIK Fotboll in the UEFA Europa League.

Insigne struggled to get a run of consecutive games at many points in the season, but participated in a large successful season at Napoli, who finished in second place in Serie A that season. Throughout the season, he made 43 appearances, scoring five goals and providing seven assists. The competition for places with players like Edinson Cavani, Goran Pandev, Eduardo Vargas and Omar El Kaddouri meant Insigne often started matches on the substitutes' bench.

The following season, Insigne made his UEFA Champions League debut in 2–1 home win over the previous season's finalists Borussia Dortmund, on 18 September 2013. Insigne marked his debut in the competition with a goal from a free-kick. In the final of the Coppa Italia on 3 May 2014, Insigne scored twice in the first half as his side won 3–1 against Fiorentina.

During the 2014–15 season, on 9 November 2014, Insigne injured the anterior cruciate ligament of his right knee in a match against Fiorentina. He returned to the pitch on 4 April 2015 after a five-month absence, coming on as a substitute in a 1–0 away defeat to Roma. In his next league match, on 26 April, he scored a goal in a 4–2 home win over Sampdoria, also wearing the captain's armband during the match, in the absence of teammates Marek Hamšík, Christian Maggio and Gökhan Inler.

On 13 September 2015, Insigne opened the 2015–16 Serie A season by scoring in a 2–2 draw against Empoli. On 20 September, he scored again in a 5–0 win over Lazio, also setting up Allan's goal. On 26 September, Insigne made his 100th Serie A appearance with Napoli and scored his third goal of the season in a 2–1 home win over defending Serie A champions Juventus, although he was also later forced off the pitch after sustaining an injury during the match; the club, however, later reported the injury was not serious. He continued his goalscoring run in the following match, scoring twice and setting up Allan's goal in a 4–0 away win over Milan, bringing his seasonal tally to five goals in seven games. Insigne's prolific performances even led to comparisons with former Napoli legend Diego Maradona, which Insigne played down.

In April 2017, Insigne scored his third brace in four appearances for Napoli to take his tally to 14 goals for the Serie A season, surpassing his previous personal best for a single campaign.

On 14 October 2017, Insigne scored his 100th career club goal in a 1–0 away win over rivals Roma in Serie A.

After Marek Hamšík's departure from the club in February 2019, Insigne was made the official captain of Napoli. On 24 August, in the opening game of the 2019–20 Serie A season, Insigne scored twice and set up two more goals in a 4–3 away win over Fiorentina.

On 13 June 2020, Insigne assisted Dries Mertens's equalising goal in a 1–1 home draw against Inter Milan in the second leg of 2019–20 Coppa Italia semi-final; the goal saw the Belgian overtake Hamšík to become Napoli's outright all-time leading goalscorer with 122 goals, while the result also allowed Napoli to advanced to the Coppa Italia Final. In the final on 17 June, Insigne netted Napoli's first spot-kick in a 4–2 penalty shoot-out victory against Juventus following a 0–0 draw after regulation time; Insigne went on to lift the trophy as the club's captain.

Toronto FC
On 8 January 2022, Insigne signed a pre-contract to join Major League Soccer club Toronto FC as a designated player on a free transfer and four-year contract that began on 1 July, with a reported annual salary of $15 million, making him the highest paid player in MLS. He made his debut for the club on 23 July, in a 4–0 home victory against Charlotte FC, only featuring in the opening half, but setting up club captain Michael Bradley's second goal of the match with a back-heel pass. On 6 August, Insigne scored his first goal for the club, converting a shot from outside the box for the game-winning goal in a 4–3 away victory against Nashville SC.

International career

Youth
A regular member of the Italy under-21 squad, Insigne made 15 appearances for the "Azzurrini", scoring seven goals. He made his debut with the under-21 side on 6 October 2011 in a European qualifying match against Liechtenstein, scoring two goals and providing two assists in a 7–2 victory.

With the under-21 team, he participated in the 2013 UEFA European Under-21 Championship under manager Devis Mangia, playing an important role in Italy's tournament run. On 5 June 2013, he made his tournament debut against England, scoring a goal from a free-kick in Italy's 1–0 opening victory. On 9 June, in Italy's second match against hosts Israel, Insigne began the play which led to Italy's first goal of the match in the 18th minute, which was scored by Riccardo Saponara. He injured himself later during the match and was forced to come off, although Italy won the match 4–0. Insigne was able to recuperate in time for the semi-final match against the Netherlands, and he came on to set up Fabio Borini's winner which sent the Italians into the final. On 18 June, Italy was defeated 4–2 against Spain in the final, although Insigne was able to set up Italy's second goal of the match, which was scored by Borini.

Senior
Insigne was called up for the first time for the Italy senior team in September 2012 at age 21 by coach Cesare Prandelli for Italy's 2014 FIFA World Cup qualifying matches against Bulgaria and Malta. He made his senior debut on 11 September 2012 in the World Cup qualifier match against Malta in Modena, coming on as a replacement for Alessandro Diamanti. On 14 August 2013, Insigne scored his first goal in a friendly against Argentina, which ended in a 2–1 loss at the Stadio Olimpico in Rome.

Insigne was named in Cesare Prandelli's 30-man provisional squad for the 2014 World Cup and was eventually picked in the final 23-man squad. In Italy's last warm-up match, against Fluminense in Brazil ahead of their World Cup opener against England, Insigne and his teammate Ciro Immobile scored five goals, with Insigne scoring two.

On 20 June 2014, Insigne made his debut in the World Cup in Italy's second group match, against Costa Rica, replacing Antonio Candreva in the second half of the 1–0 defeat. However, this was Insigne's only appearance in the tournament, as Italy was eliminated in the group stage.

On 31 May 2016, Insigne was named to Antonio Conte's 23-man Italy squad for UEFA Euro 2016. He made his first appearance of the tournament on 22 June, coming off the bench in Italy's final group match, which ended in a 1–0 defeat to the Republic of Ireland, striking the post and later receiving a yellow card in injury time. In the round of 16, at the Stade de France in Paris on 27 June, he came off the bench once again to help set-up Graziano Pellè's 91st minute volley to give the Azzurri a 2–0 win over defending champions Spain. On 2 July, he made a further substitute appearance in the quarter-final fixture against Germany and scored Italy's first penalty in the resulting shoot-out, which ended in a 6–5 loss to the reigning World Cup champions.

In June 2021, Insigne was included in Italy's squad for UEFA Euro 2020 by manager Roberto Mancini. In the opening match of the tournament on 11 June, he scored Italy's final goal in a 3–0 win over Turkey. On 2 July, he scored Italy's second goal of the match in a 2–1 win over Belgium in the quarter-finals of the competition, with a curling right-footed effort from outside the box following an individual run; for his performance, he was named star of the match by UEFA, while the goal later placed second in UEFA's "2020–21 Goal of the Season," behind only Mehdi Taremi's overhead kick goal for Porto against Chelsea in the Champions League quarter-finals. On 11 July, Insigne won the European Championship with Italy following a 3–2 penalty shoot-out victory over England at Wembley Stadium in the final, after a 1–1 draw in extra-time; Insigne started the match, but was replaced by Andrea Belotti late in the second half of regulation time. Throughout the competition, Insigne made more solo runs into the penalty area (16) than any other player.

Style of play
Nicknamed "Lorenzo Il Magnifico" ("Lorenzo the Magnificent", in Italian), Insigne is a fast, talented, skillful and diminutive right footed winger, with an eye for the goal, who is usually deployed on the left in a 4–3–3 or in a 4–2–3–1 formation, which allows him to utilise his acceleration to cut inside and curl shots on goal with his stronger foot, in particular from outside the penalty area. Due to his penchant for scoring goals in his manner, which according to Insigne was inspired by his "idol" Alessandro Del Piero's trademark goals, in 2021, the neologism tiraggiro – derived from "tir a gir" ("tiro a giro", in Italian, or "curling shot", in English) in Insigne's native Neapolitan dialect – was coined and included in the Italian encyclopedia Treccani. Although his preferred role is on the left flank, he is a hard-working, tactically intelligent, and versatile forward, capable of playing in any offensive position on either side of the pitch, or even through the centre; he is also known for his defensive contribution and ability to cover a lot of ground during matches, in addition to his offensive capabilities, despite his lack of physicality. He has often operated in deeper, more creative positions, either in a free role in the centre as an attacking midfield playmaker behind the strikers, or as a supporting forward, due to his passing ability and vision, which enable him to link-up with midfielders, create chances, and provide assists for teammates. He is also capable of playing in a more offensive central role as a false 9. In addition to his ability to set-up goals, he is also capable of scoring them himself, and is an accurate set-piece taker. Insigne's resulting low centre of gravity, combined with his creativity, quick feet and technical ability, make him extremely quick and agile in possession, and give him excellent balance and control of the ball, which, along with his flair, intelligent movement, speed, and dribbling skills, allows him to beat opponents and create space for his team in attacking areas, or make attacking runs off the ball into the box. Regarded as one of Italy's most promising prospects in his youth, due to his attributes, skill, pace and small stature, his former Napoli teammate and North Macedonia captain Goran Pandev has referred to him as the "Italian Messi"; he was also compared to former Napoli player Diego Maradona in his youth. Manager Delio Rossi also likened him to compatriots Fabrizio Miccoli – "for his turn of pace and cleverness" – and Gianfranco Zola in 2012. After scoring a goal, Insigne often celebrates by making a "heart" gesture with his hands.

Personal life
Lorenzo Insigne has three brothers, all of whom are footballers: his younger brother Roberto, as well as Marco and Antonio. Lorenzo married Genoveffa "Jenny" Darone on 31 December 2012; they have two children together: Carmine, born on 4 April 2013, and Christian, born on 13 March 2015.

Career statistics

Club

International

Scores and results list Italy's goal tally first, score column indicates score after each Insigne goal.

Honours
Pescara
 Serie B: 2011–12

Napoli 
 Coppa Italia: 2013–14, 2019–20
 Supercoppa Italiana: 2014
Italy U21
 UEFA European Under-21 Championship runner-up: 2013

Italy
 UEFA European Championship: 2020
 UEFA Nations League third place: 2020–21
Individual
 Serie B Footballer of the Year: 2012
 Coppa Italia top goalscorer: 2013–14
 Serie A Player of the Month: March 2021
Orders
  5th Class / Knight: Cavaliere Ordine al Merito della Repubblica Italiana: 2021

Trivia
Insigne has contributed to popularising the term tiraggiro in Italy; following Insigne's goals and role in Italy's victorious Euro 2020 campaign, the word was subsequently included in the Treccani encyclopaedia in 2021, as a result of its recurring use as a reference to Insigne, or other players, using his trademark shooting technique, which usually involves him curling shots on goal from outside the box after cutting inside from the left flank onto his stronger right foot. The definition of the neologism is "the curling shot, taken hitting the ball so as to curve it with an inward curl", "adaptation of the spoken Neapolitan tir a ggir": excerpts of newspaper articles about Insigne are frequently cited as an example of the usage of this term.

References

External links

 Career summary by AIC.football.it
 Profile & Statistics on the Lega Serie A official website
 Profile on the FIGC official website 

1991 births
Living people
Footballers from Naples
Footballers from Campania
Association football forwards
Italian footballers
Serie A players
Serie B players
Serie C players
S.S.C. Napoli players
Toronto FC players
Major League Soccer players
Cavese 1919 players
Calcio Foggia 1920 players
Delfino Pescara 1936 players
Italy youth international footballers
Italy under-21 international footballers
Italy international footballers
2014 FIFA World Cup players
UEFA Euro 2016 players
UEFA Euro 2020 players
UEFA European Championship-winning players
Knights of the Order of Merit of the Italian Republic
Italian expatriate footballers
Expatriate soccer players in Canada
Italian expatriate sportspeople in Canada